Andreas Gursky (born 15 January 1955) is a German photographer and professor at the Kunstakademie Düsseldorf, Germany.

He is known for his large format architecture and landscape colour photographs, often using a high point of view. His works reach some of the highest prices in the art market among living photographers. His photograph Rhein II was sold for $4,338,500 on 8 November 2011.

Gursky shares a studio with Laurenz Berges, Thomas Ruff and Axel Hütte on the Hansaallee, in Düsseldorf. The building, a former electricity station, was transformed into an artists studio and living quarters, in 2001, by architects Herzog & de Meuron, of Tate Modern fame. In 2010–11, the architects worked again on the building, designing a gallery in the basement.

Education
Gursky was born in Leipzig, East Germany in 1955. His family relocated to West Germany, moving to Essen and then Düsseldorf by the end of 1957. From 1978 to 1981, he attended the Universität Gesamthochschule Essen, where he studied visual communication, led by photographers Otto Steinert and Michael Schmidt. Gursky is said to have attended the university to hear Otto Steinert, however Steinert died in 1978 and Gursky only got to attend a few of his lectures.

Between 1981 and 1987 at the Düsseldorf Art Academy, Gursky received critical training and influence from his teachers Hilla and Bernd Becher, a photographic team known for their distinctive, dispassionate method of systematically cataloging industrial machinery and architecture. Gursky demonstrates a similarly methodical approach in his own larger-scale photography. Other notable influences are the British landscape photographer John Davies, whose highly detailed high vantage point images had a strong effect on the street level photographs Gursky was then making, and to a lesser degree the American photographer Joel Sternfeld.

Career and style
Before the 1990s, Gursky did not digitally manipulate his images. In the years since, Gursky has been frank about his reliance on computers to edit and enhance his pictures, creating an art of spaces larger than the subjects photographed. Writing in The New Yorker magazine, the critic Peter Schjeldahl called these pictures "vast," "splashy," "entertaining," and "literally unbelievable." In the same publication, critic Calvin Tomkins described Gursky as one of the "two masters" of the Düsseldorf School of Photography. In 2001, Tomkins described the experience of confronting one of Gursky's large works:

The perspective in many of Gursky's photographs is drawn from an elevated vantage point. This position enables the viewer to encounter scenes, encompassing both centre and periphery, which are ordinarily beyond reach. This sweeping perspective has been linked to an engagement with globalization. Visually, Gursky is drawn to large, anonymous, man-made spaces—high-rise facades at night, office lobbies, stock exchanges, the interiors of big box retailers (See his print 99 Cent II Diptychon). In a 2001 retrospective, New York's Museum of Modern Art described the artist's work, "a sophisticated art of unembellished observation. It is thanks to the artfulness of Gursky's fictions that we recognize his world as our own." Gursky's style is enigmatic and deadpan. There is little to no explanation or manipulation on the works. His photography is straightforward.

Gursky's Dance Valley festival photograph, taken near Amsterdam in 1995, depicts attendees facing a DJ stand in a large arena, beneath strobe lighting effects. The pouring smoke resembles a human hand, holding the crowd in stasis. After completing the print, Gursky explained the only music he now listens to is the anonymous, beat-heavy style known as Trance, as its symmetry and simplicity echoes his own work—while playing towards a deeper, more visceral emotion.

The photograph 99 Cent (1999) was taken at a 99 Cents Only store on Sunset Boulevard in Los Angeles, and depicts its interior as a stretched horizontal composition of parallel shelves, intersected by vertical white columns, in which the abundance of "neatly labeled packets are transformed into fields of colour, generated by endless arrays of identical products, reflecting off the shiny ceiling" (Wyatt Mason). Rhein II (1999), depicts a stretch of the river Rhine outside Düsseldorf, immediately legible as a view of a straight stretch of water, but also as an abstract configuration of horizontal bands of colour of varying widths. In his six-part series Ocean I-VI (2009–2010), Gursky used high-definition satellite photographs which he augmented from various picture sources on the Internet.

Art market
Most of Gursky's photographs come in editions of six with two artist's proofs.

Since 2010, Gursky has been represented by Gagosian Gallery. He held the record for highest price paid at auction for a single photographic image from 2011 to 2022. His print Rhein II sold for US$4,338,500 at Christie's, New York on 8 November 2011. In 2013, Chicago Board of Trade III (1999–2009) sold for $3,298,755, an auction record for a Gursky exchange photo.

Publications
 Andreas Gursky. Cologne: Galerie Johnen + Schöttle, 1988. Exhibition catalogue.
 Andreas Gursky. Krefeld: Museum Haus Lange, 1989. Exhibition catalogue.
 Siemens Kulturprogramm: Projekte 1992. Munich: Siemens AG, 1992. Exhibition catalogue.
 Andreas Gursky.Cologne: Buchhandlung Walther König; Zurich: Kunsthalle, 1992. Exhibition catalogue.
 Fotografien 1984–1993. Hamburg: Deichtorhallen; Munich: Schirmer/ Mosel, 1994. Exhibition catalogue.
 Montparnasse. Cologne: Portikus & Oktagon, 1995. Exhibition catalogue.
 Andreas Gursky. Malmö: Rooseum Center for Contemporary Art, Malmö; Cologne, Oktagon, 1995. Exhibition catalogue.
 Images. London: Tate, 1995. Exhibition catalogue.
 Andreas Gursky: Fotografien 1984 bis heute. Düsseldorf: Kunsthalle Düsseldorf; Munich: Schirmer/Mosel, 1998. Exhibition catalogue.
 Andreas Gursky. Fotografien 1994–1998. Wolfsburg: Kunstmuseum Wolfsburg; Ostfildern, Hatje Cantz, 1998. Exhibition catalogue.
 Currents 27. Andreas Gursky. Houston: Contemporary Arts Museum, Houston, 1998. Exhibition catalogue.
 Andreas Gursky. New York: Museum of Modern Art; Ostfildern: Hatje Cantz, 2001. Exhibition catalogue.
 Andreas Gursky. Paris: Centre national d’art et de culture Georges-Pompidou, 2002. Exhibition catalogue.
 Andreas Gursky. Cologne: Snoeck, 2007. Edited by Thomas Weski. . With an essay in English and German by Weski, and a text by Don DeLillo, "In Yankee Stadium". Exhibition catalogue.
 Andreas Gursky. Basel: Kunstmuseum; Ostfildern: Hatje Cantz, 2007. Exhibition catalogue.
 Kaiserringträger der Stadt Goslar 2008. Goslar: Mönchehaus Museum; Goslar, Verein zur Förderung moderner Kunst, 2008. Exhibition catalogue.
 Architektur. Darmstadt: Institut Mathildenhöhe; Ostfildern, Hatje Cantz, 2008. Exhibition catalogue.
 Werke – Works 80-08. Kunstmuseen Krefeld/ Moderna Museet, Stockholm/ Vancouver Art Gallery; Ostfildern: Hatje Cantz, 2008. Exhibition catalogue.
 Andreas Gursky. Los Angeles: Gagosian Gallery; New York: Rizzoli, 2010. Exhibition catalogue. Two volumes.
 Andreas Gursky at Louisiana. Louisiana: Louisiana Museum of Modern Art; Ostfildern: Hatje Cantz, 2011. Exhibition catalogue.
 Bangkok. Düsseldorf: Stiftung Museum Kunstpalast; Göttingen: Steidl, 2012. Exhibition catalogue.
 Andreas Gursky. Tokyo: The National Art Centre; Osaka: The National Museum of Art; Tokyo/Osaka: Yomiuri Shimbun, 2013. Exhibition catalogue.
 Landscapes. Exhibition catalogue. Water Mills: Parrish Art Museum; New York: Rizzoli, 2015.
 Andreas Gursky. Steidl/Hayward Gallery, 2018. Exhibition catalog.

Exhibitions
Gursky first exhibited his work in Germany in 1985. His first solo gallery show was held at Galerie Johnen & Schöttle, Cologne, in 1988. Gursky's first one-person museum exhibition in the United States opened at the Milwaukee Art Museum in 1998, and his work was the subject of a retrospective organized by The Museum of Modern Art, New York, in 2001, and touring). Further museum exhibitions include Werke-Works 80-08, Kunstmuseen Krefeld (2008, and touring); and Haus der Kunst, Munich (2007, and touring). His work has been seen in international exhibitions, including the Internationale Foto-Triennale in Esslingen (1989 and 1995), the Venice Biennale (1990 and 2004), and the Biennale of Sydney (1996 and 2000).
 1989 Museum Haus Lange, Krefeld; Centre Genevois de Gravure Contemporaine, Geneva, Switzerland
 1992 Kunsthalle Zürich, Switzerland
 1994 Deichtorhallen, Hamburg
 1995 Rooseum, Malmö, Sweden; Tate Liverpool, UK
 1998 Andreas Gursky: Photographs 1994–1998, Kunsthalle Düsseldorf; Fotomuseum Winterthur, Switzerland; Milwaukee Art Museum, Milwaukee, USA; Contemporary Arts Museum Houston, USA; Serpentine Gallery, London; Scottish National Gallery of Modern Art, Edinburgh, Scotland; Castle of Rivoli, Turin, Italy
 2000 Sprengel Museum, Hannover; Galerie für Zeitgenössische Kunst, Leipzig
 2001 Museum of Modern Art, New York City; Museo Nacional Centro de Arte Reina Sofía, Madrid, Spain, 2001; Centre Georges Pompidou, Paris, 2002; Museum of Contemporary Art, Chicago, 2002
 2003 San Francisco Museum of Modern Art, San Francisco, USA
 2007 Haus der Kunst, Munich, Germany; touring to İstanbul Modern, Sharjah Art Museum and National Gallery of Victoria, Melbourne, 2007–2008.
 2007 Kunstmuseum Basel, Basel
 Werke-Works 80-08, Kunstmuseen Krefeld, 2008 and touring to Moderna Museet, Stockholm and Vancouver Art Gallery, 2009
 2008 Exhibition Building Mathildenhöhe, Darmstadt, Germany
 2008 Museum für Moderne Kunst, Frankfurt am Main, Germany
 2008–2009 National Gallery of Victoria International, Melbourne, Australia
 2012 Louisiana Museum of Modern Art, Humlebaek, Denmark
 2012 Museum Kunstpalast, Düsseldorf, Germany
 2013 National Art Center, Tokyo
 2014 National Museum of Art, Osaka, Japan
 2018 Hayward Gallery, London

Public collections
Gursky's work is held, among others, in the following public collections:

See also
 List of most expensive photographs
 Aerial landscape art
 Contemporary art
 Globalization

References

External links
 
 The main works of Andreas Gursky
 Ralph Rugoff on Andreas Gursky
 Andreas Gursky on Artcyclopedia
 
 2001 Andreas Gursky Exhibition at the Museum of Modern Art.
  A.Gursky – Solo Exhibition 2007 in Munich
 Andreas Gursky’s Personal Exhibition in the Ekaterina Cultural Foundation
 Andreas Gursky, Kunstmuseum Basel Video at VernissageTV 2007

1955 births
Living people
Photographers from North Rhine-Westphalia
Kunstakademie Düsseldorf alumni
Artists from Düsseldorf
German contemporary artists
20th-century German photographers
21st-century German photographers
University of Duisburg-Essen alumni